The 2007 European Women Sevens Championship was the fifth edition of the European Women's Sevens Championship.

T-EN Tournament 2007
Date/Venue: 18 March 2007, Székesfehérvár, Hungary
Games
Hungary 34-0 Austria
Austria 7-19 Croatia
Croatia 14-0 Hungary
Hungary 10-10 Austria
Austria 0-14 Croatia
Croatia 0-15 Hungary

Emerging (European) Nations 2007 
Played at Katowice, Poland on 27 April to 1 May 2007, this appears to have been part training camp, part tournament. (Source Austria Union)

Group A saw Finland, Croatia, Bosnia and Poland I.
Group B saw Bulgaria, Czech Republic, Austria and a combined Czech/Polish II.
It is known that this was Finlands first tournament.

Classification Stages 
7th/8th
Bosnia beat Czech Republic/Poland II
5th/6th
Austria beat Poland
3rd/4th
Czech Republic beat Croatia
1st/2nd
Finland 10-5 Bulgaria

FIRA-AER Tournament 2007 - Division B 
Date/Venue: Zenica, Bosnia, 19–20 May 2007 (Source Fira-Aer) Summarised

Pool Stages
POOL One

Malta 14-0 Denmark
Malta 7-7 Hungary
Malta 19-14 Finland
Malta 17-0 Bosnia Herzogovina
Malta 53-0 Serbia
Denmark 10-5 Hungary
Denmark 0-19 Finland
Denmark 41-0 Bosnia Herzogovina
Denmark 27-0 Serbia
Hungary 0-31 Finland
Hungary 10-0 Bosnia Herzogovina
Hungary 17-0 Serbia
Finland 32-0 Bosnia Herzogovina
Finland 55-0 Serbia
Bosnia Herzogovina 0-16 Serbia
POOL TwoNote: Slovakia and Georgia withdrew, Moldova joined leaving one team missing in the group. A Barbarians team is also listed in this group as having lost all games 0-3 suggesting the games were not counted towards the tournament.

Luxembourg 17-5 Latvia
Moldova 25-10 Luxembourg
Israel 0-5 Moldova
Israel 0-19 Austria
Moldova 22-0 Latvia
Austria 44-5 Luxembourg
Austria 20-0 Latvia
Israel 20-0 Luxembourg
Austria 19-10 Moldova
Israel 10-0 Latvia 0

Classification Stages 
Semi-finals

9th-12th Semi-finals
Latvia 17-5 Bosnia Herzogovina
Serbia w/o

5th-8th Semi-finals
Israel 10-5 Hungary
Luxembourg 5-29 Denmark

1st-4th Semi-finals
Austria 0-27 Finland
Moldova 5-17 Malta
Finals

11th/12th Final
Bosnia Herzogovina w/o

9th/10th Final Bowl
Latvia 0-17 Serbia

7th/8th Final
Hungary 24-5 Luxembourg

5th/6th Final Plate
Israel 0-27 Denmark

3rd/4th Final
Austria 0-12 Moldova

1st/2nd Final Cup
Finland 10-5 Malta

FIRA-AER Tournament 2007 - Division A 
Date/Venue: Zagreb, Croatia, 26–27 May 2007 (Source Fira-Aer) Summarised

Pool Stages
POOL One

Switzerland 43-0 Croatia
 12-5 Romania
France U20 38-0 Czech Republic
Romania 26-0 Croatia
Switzerland 31-14 Czech Republic
France U20 17-5 
Czech Republic 12-14 Croatia
France U20 17-5 Romania
 10-15 Switzerland
Romania 19-0 Czech Republic
 14-0 Croatia
France U20 27-0 Switzerland
 24-0 Czech Republic
Switzerland 17-0 Romania
France U20 47-0 Croatia
POOL Two

Norway 26-0 Bulgaria
Germany 29-7 Andorra
Lithuania 42-5 Poland
Andorra 22-5 Bulgaria
Norway 31-0 Poland
Lithuania 14-12 Germany
Poland 0-29 Bulgaria
Lithuania 12-7 Andorra
Germany 25-0 Norway
Andorra 19-5 Poland
Germany 34-0 Bulgaria
Lithuania 19-7 Norway
Germany 40-5 Poland
Norway 7-15 Andorra
Lithuania 28-0 Bulgaria

Classification Stages 
9th-12th Semi-finals
Croatia 12-17 Poland
Czech Republic 38-0 Bulgaria

5th-8th Semi-finals
 17-0 Norway
Romania 5-0 Andorra

1st-4th Semi-finals
France U20 40-0 Germany
Switzerland 20-0 Lithuania
Finals

11th/12th Final
Croatia 24-0 Bulgaria

9th/10th Final Bowl
Poland 5-17 Czech Republic

7th/8th Final
Norway 26-0 Andorra

5th/6th Final Plate
 10-5 Romania

3rd/4th Final
Germany 22-5 Lithuania

1st/2nd Final Cup
France U20 46-0 Switzerland

FIRA-AER Tournament 2007 - Top 10 
Date/Venue: Lunel, France, 2–3 June 2007 (Source Fira-Aer) Summarised

Pool Stages
POOL One

Italy 7-15 Wales
Ireland 5-10 Spain
Wales 32-0 Portugal
Ireland 19-17 Italy
Spain 19-0 Portugal
Wales 5-0 Ireland
Spain 28-0 Italy
Ireland 31-0 Portugal
Wales 0-0 Spain
Italy 12-12 Portugal
POOL Two

Russia 0-45 England
Netherlands 6-39 France
England 19-0 Sweden
Netherlands 26-5 Russia
France 26-0 Sweden
England 45-0 Netherlands
France 45-0 Russia
Sweden 14-20 Netherland
England 12-15 France
Russia 12-12 Sweden

Classification Stages 
5th-8th Semi-finals
Ireland 26-0 Sweden
Italy 17-15 Netherlands

1st-4th Semi-finals
Spain 10-12 England
Wales 0-21 France
Finals

9th/10th Final Bowl
Portugal 7-26 Russia
7th/8th Final
Netherlands 12-10 Sweden
5th/6th Final Plate
Italy 5-19 Ireland
3rd/4th Final
Wales 0-10 Spain
1st/2nd Final Cup
England 5-19 France

T-EN League 2007 
Played on 23 June 2007 at Grossmugl, Austria during the Friendly Games (a wider reaching 10s tournament) (Source Austria Union)
Austria 36-0 Hungary
Hungary 0-33 Croatia
Austria 5-35 Croatia
Austria 21-5 Hungary
Hungary 0-59 Croatia
Austria 5-31 Croatia

References

Rugby Europe Women's Sevens
2007 rugby sevens competitions
Sevens